Misaki Doi was the defending champion but chose to compete at the 2022 Torneig Internacional Els Gorchs instead.

Taylor Townsend won the title, defeating Yuan Yue in the final, 6–4, 6–2.

Seeds

Draw

Finals

Top half

Bottom half

References

External Links
Main Draw

Christus Health Pro Challenge - Singles